BoJack Horseman (Music From The Netflix Original Series) is the soundtrack album to the adult animated black comedy-drama series BoJack Horseman (2014–2020). The soundtrack for the series released by Lakeshore Records in digital and physical formats on September 1 and 29, 2017. It includes several songs, among them the full version of the main theme, Patrick Carney and Michelle Branch's version of America's "A Horse with No Name", Sextina Aquafina's "Get Dat Fetus, Kill Dat Fetus", the themes from Horsin' Around and Mr. Peanutbutter's House, and the entire score for the episode "Fish Out of Water". A vinyl edition was released on January 12, 2018, and a second re-issue was released in September 2020.

Development 
The main title theme was composed by Patrick Carney, drummer for the blues-rock duo the Black Keys, with his uncle Ralph Carney. The initial sound is Patrick's Roland Jupiter-4 analog synthesizer running an arpeggiator patch, triggered externally with a click track control voltage from Pro Tools. Patrick added acoustic drums, and emailed the music to his uncle Ralph who added various saxophone parts and bass trombone. Patrick composed the song merely as a test of his new home studio arrangement, not knowing where it would go. A few months later, Noel Bright emailed Patrick asking for a piece of music as a theme for BoJack Horseman, and Patrick sent him the collaboration tune, which was immediately accepted. The television show opening theme was edited down to about 55 seconds long but the Carneys' original collaboration is several minutes longer, containing parts not heard on the show.

The ending credits theme "Back in the 90s (BoJack's Theme)" was performed by the indie-pop act Grouplove. Jesse Novak composed the incidental music for the series. Raphael Bob-Waksberg, the showrunner hired him for the scores, as he previously worked on some of the sketch comedies he hosted. Bob-Waksberg wanted him to score a demo for the series, which he agreed and sent his demo music pieces for the series. He was a fan of Lisa Hanawalt's work, the illustrator of the show, and had added "A lot of the music I feel I continued in the show I started in that first week demoing for them because I felt that inspiration for a lot of the sound came from the visuals and feelings that I was already familiar with through Lisa and Rafael’s work."

For the "Horsin' Around" theme song which Novak had sang, he stated that was interested on doing music which was a "genre parody" and attributed that composing for spoof and parody genres is an "opportunity to experiment with those sounds which manage to tickle your own funny bone and hopefully reach the viewers that way too". The theme was primarily influenced from the musical sound of Full House (1987–1995) as he used saxophone and harmonica for the theme, which imitated the muzak sounds. For the third episode Prickly-Muffin, he composed a score suite, which was a mix of "Britney Spears and The Neptunes"; as he was influenced by their works, he tried to attempt the same so as it recreates the music from the late-1990s and early-2000s. However, he tweaked the pop culture references, to be more comedic and felt that editing the vocals was the most important part of the show.

The theme for Mr. Peanutbutter's House was composed by the help of Los Angeles Philharmonic. Novak admitted Mr. Peanutbutter as his favourite character and wanted his theme to be "influenced by hip-hop but in a slightly uninformed way". Originally planned as a 10-second song, as he did not have an idea to compose a full theme, it was later extended to a 45-second theme after the creators requested for a full-length theme for a character in the third season. So he hired vocalists from the Philharmonic orchestra to perform the theme song. Novak took a lot of time to write the entire score for the "Fish Out Of Water" episode and also re-wrote twice for two instances as the first piece he wrote, was not well received. He incorporated electronic sounds to add more color for the score.

Track listing

Songs featured in the series 
In addition to Novak's score, the show has occasionally featured other songs in the closing credits. In season one, Lyla Foy's song "Impossible" appears in the end credits of the seventh episode, "Say Anything"; the Death Grips song "No Love" is used in "Downer Ending", the eleventh episode; and the Rolling Stones song "Wild Horses" and Tegan and Sara's "Closer" in "Later", the first-season finale. The Kevin Morby song "Parade" closed out "Yes And", episode ten of the second season, and the Courtney Barnett song "Avant Gardener" plays during "Out to Sea", the second-season finale. The show features Oberhofer's song "Sea of Dreams" in the fourth episode of the third season, "Fish out of Water", and Nina Simone's cover of Janis Ian's "Stars" in "That Went Well", the last episode of that season. In season four, Magic Sword's "Infinite" is used in "Thoughts and Prayers", the fifth episode of the season, K.Flay's "Blood in the Cut" in "Stupid Piece of Sh*t", the sixth episode, and Jenny Owen Youngs's "Wake Up" in "What Time Is It Right Now", the twelfth episode.

Princess Carolyn's hold music is the song "Jellicle Songs for Jellicle Cats" from the musical Cats. The St. Vincent song "Los Ageless" plays throughout "The Light Bulb Scene", the first episode of the fifth season, including the credits. The song "Under the Pressure" by the War on Drugs plays through the end of the episode and credits of season five, episode 12, "The Stopped Show". The 2007 song "Mr. Blue" by Catherine Feeny, used in the final moments of the series finale, received appreciation from fans.

Reception 
The Afterglow magazine's C.S Harper wrote that the soundtrack "creates a grim storyline, one that is often the reality for those in the entertainment world. By mirroring BoJack’s story through song, the soundtrack adds a tone of self-awareness to the show. Each season uses diverse tracks from different genres to comment on a variety of themes, including substance abuse and the meaninglessness of celebrity life. Though these topics are dark, they explore the less glamorous facets of the Hollywood experience that many people overlook." Relight's A. J. Martin wrote "the soundtrack is really only something that’s appealing for fans of the show, but there’s pieces of it anyone could enjoy". Variety named the title theme as one of the "best theme songs of the streaming era". Writing for Looper magazine, Mike Floorwalker praised about the theme song saying, "Its dream-like vibe, punctuated with pounding, distorted drums and a knife-edged horn section, is nothing short of perfect; it somehow manages to broadcast the show's entire aesthetic despite its complete absence of lyrics."

Chart performance

References 

2017 soundtrack albums
Television animation soundtracks